Solomys is a genus of rodent in the family Muridae. These large rats, which are all seriously threatened (one already extinct), are native to the Solomon Islands.
 
It contains the following species:
 Poncelet's giant rat (Solomys ponceleti)
 Florida naked-tailed rat (Solomys salamonis)
 Bougainville naked-tailed rat (Solomys salebrosus)
 Isabel naked-tailed rat (Solomys sapientis)
 Buka Island naked-tailed rat (Solomys spriggsarum) – extinct, known only from subfossil remains.

References

 
Rodent genera
Taxa named by Oldfield Thomas
Taxonomy articles created by Polbot